Konggang Subdistrict is a subdistrict in the southwestern portion of Shunyi District, Beijing, China. It shares border with Houshayu Town in its north, Tianzhu Town in its east, and Sunhe Township in its southwest. As of 2020, it had a population of 99,297.

The subdistrict was created from parts of Tianzhu and Houshayu Towns in 2007.

Administrative divisions 

In 2021, Konggang Subdistrict consisted of 32 subdivisions, of which 24 were communities and 8 were villages:

Gallery

See also 

 List of township-level divisions of Beijing

References 

Shunyi District
Subdistricts of Beijing